The 19th Assembly District of Wisconsin is one of 99 districts in the Wisconsin State Assembly. Located in southeastern Wisconsin, the district is entirely contained within the city of Milwaukee, in Milwaukee County, covering downtown and part of the Lake Michigan coastline.  It contains the University of Wisconsin–Milwaukee campus, the Milwaukee Art Museum (Quadracci Pavilion), the Port of Milwaukee, and the Henry Maier Festival Park, site of Milwaukee's annual Summerfest.  The is represented by Democrat Ryan Clancy, since January 2023.

The 19th Assembly district is located within Wisconsin's 7th Senate district, along with the 20th and 21st Assembly districts.

List of past representatives

References 

Wisconsin State Assembly districts
Milwaukee County, Wisconsin